Lion Island is a small island lying east of the mouth of Hunt Glacier in Granite Harbor, Victoria Land. It was named by the British Antarctic Expedition, 1910–13.

Its name inspired the nearby Tiger Island.

See also 
 List of antarctic and sub-antarctic islands
 

Islands of Victoria Land